The Riegner Telegram was a telegraph message sent on  8 August 1942 from Gerhart Riegner, then Secretary of World Jewish Congress (Geneva), to its New York and London offices.  The cable confirmed the alarming reports that had reached the West previously about the German intention to mass murder the European Jews.

Riegner was office manager of the WJC in Geneva. He was indirectly informed about the German plans for the final solution by German industrialist Eduard Schulte. Through his British and American diplomatic channels (Rabbi Stephen Samuel Wise of the American Jewish Congress in New York and Sydney Silverman, a Jewish Member of Parliament and Chairman of the British Section, World Jewish Congress) Riegner sent the following message to his contacts via the British Foreign Office and the State Department in Washington:

However, in England and the United States, Riegner's telegram was met with disbelief. The US State Department considered the telegram "a wild rumor, fueled by Jewish anxieties" while the British Foreign Office didn't forward the telegram for some time. Only on the 28 August 1942 did it find its way to the President of the World Jewish Congress, Rabbi Stephen Wise. On the advice of Under Secretary of State Sumner Welles, Wise decided to not make it public until confirmation had been received from State Department sources. When that happened in November, Wise held a press conference about it but it received little attention until the Bergson Group began to publicise it.

See also

 Jäger Report, 1941
 Einsatzgruppen reports, 1941–1942
 Wilhelm Cornides Report, 1942
 Wannsee Conference, 1942
 Raczyński's Note, 1942
 Pilecki's Report, 1943
 Katzmann Report, 1943
 Korherr Report, 1943
 Gerstein Report, 1945
 Allied knowledge of the atrocities
 Höfle Telegram containing German statistics on the 1942 killings
 Special Prosecution Book-Poland, 1937–1939
 https://encyclopedia.ushmm.org/content/en/article/the-riegner-telegram

Notes

References
70 Years Ago: Riegner Telegram alerts world about Nazi Holocaust - World Jewish Congress website
The National Archives UK copy of the Riegner Telegram
Günter Schubert: Der Fleck auf Uncle Sams weißer Weste. Amerika und die jüdischen Flüchtlinge 1938-1945., Campus Verlag, Frankfurt/New York
Heiner Lichtenstein: "Warum Auschwitz nicht bombardiert wurde", Köln 1980
Walter Laqueur: Was niemand wissen wollte. Die Unterdrückung der Nachricht über Hitlers Endlösung", Frankfurt a. M. 1981
Gerhard M. Riegner: "Niemals verzweifeln. Sechzig Jahre für das jüdische Volk und die Menschenrechte" Gerlingen 2001
Portraits Parlés: Interview and portraits of Gerhard M. Riegner by Ariane Laroux, éditions of L'Age d'Homme. (2006)
Michael Berenaum: "A Promise to Remember" Bulfinch Press 2003

Telegrams
Holocaust historical documents
The Holocaust and the United States
1942 documents